Maxim Gresler (born 3 June 2003) is a German professional footballer who plays as a left-back for 1860 Munich II.

Career
Gresler signed his first professional contract with 1860 Munich on 2 March 2020. He made his professional debut for the team in the 3. Liga on 9 January 2021, coming on as a substitute for Merveille Biankadi in second-half stoppage time against Bayern Munich II. The match finished as a 2–0 away win for 1860.

References

External links
 
 
 

2003 births
21st-century German people
People from Bad Tölz
Sportspeople from Upper Bavaria
Footballers from Bavaria
Living people
German footballers
Association football fullbacks
TSV 1860 Munich II players
TSV 1860 Munich players
3. Liga players
Bayernliga players